The Authority for the Protection of the Site and Management of the Region of Angkor, also called APSARA or the APSARA National Authority, is a Cambodian management authority responsible for protecting the Angkor Archaeological Park. Founded in 1995, it is in charge of the research, protection, and conservation as well as the urban and tourist development of the park. It is headquartered in Siem Reap. It consisted of eight departments and more than 3000 personnel.

APSARA National Authority is a Public Administration Organization under technical supervision of the Ministry of Culture and Fine Arts and under financial supervision of the Ministry of Economy and Finance.

Board of Directors
The Board of Directors of APSARA National Authority consists of nine members:
Minister of Culture and Fine Arts is the President of the Board of Directors
Representative of the Ministry of Economy and Finance
Representative of the Ministry of Interior
Representative of the Ministry of Land Management, Urban Planning and Construction
Representative of the Ministry of Tourism
Representative of the Ministry of Environment
Governor of Siem Reap
Director General of APSARA National Authority
Representative of Staffs of APSARA National Authority

Departments
APSARA is headed by a Director General, four Deputy Directors General and there are eight departments:
Department of Research, Training and Communication
Department of Conservation of the Monuments and Preventive Archaeology
Department of Tourism Development and Culture 
Department of Land Management, Urban Heritage and Community
Department of Water, Forestry and Infrastructure Management
Department of Administration and Personnel
Department of Public Order
Department of Finance and Accounting

Museums
There are three museums under the management of the Department of Tourism Development and Culture:
Preah Norodom Sihanouk-Angkor Museum
MGC Asian Traditional Textiles Museum 
Angkor Ceramic Museum at Tani

References

External links 

Government of Cambodia
Angkorian sites